The 2009–10 Championnat de France Amateurs 2 season was the 12th edition of the competition since its establishment. The competition officially began on 15 August and ended in May 2010. The competition consisted of 128 clubs spread into 8 parallel groups of 16. It was open to reserve teams in France and amateur clubs in France, however, unlike the preceding league Championnat de France amateur, both the reserve and amateur clubs are eligible for promotion to the next league, the Championnat de France amateur. The highest-placed team in each pool are promoted, replaced by the 3 lowest-placed in the Championnat de France amateur.

DNCG Rulings
All clubs that secured CFA 2 status for this season were subject to approval by the DNCG before becoming eligible to participate.

Following the DNCG's annual report on clubs, on 25 June, it was announced that three clubs had been relegated from the National to the CFA 2. Besançon RC, US Luzenac, and FC Rouen, who were all promoted to the Championnat National, were relegated due to financial abnormalities in their accounts. All clubs relegated were allowed to appeal the decision.

Following an appeal from the aforementioned clubs, the CNOSF determined that Besançon should be relegated to the CFA and not CFA 2. FC Rouen and US Luzenac had their appeals overturned meaning they would remain in the Championnat National.

On 29 July, the French Football Federation unanimously suspended newly promoted CFA club Toulouse Rodéo FC from the league and to the CFA 2 following abnormalities detected in the club's use of non-licensed players. The club was replaced by Red Star Saint-Ouen, who were relegated from the CFA last year.

On 6 August, just three days before the start of the season, the CNSOF ruled that CFA 2 club Olympique Saumur would be allowed promotion to the CFA on the assumption that the club was ranked second behind Les Herbiers VF in terms of the promotion chart following a current CFA club's relegation by means of a federation ruling. With Besançon's relegation to the CFA, it has been determined that two groups would have an allocation of 20 clubs, while one group would have an allocation of 19 clubs. Due to the sudden circumstances, on 7 August, the FFF devised a brand new schedule for the CFA. The federation also announced that they had rejected the CNOSF's proposal for integrating Saumur into the CFA. Saumur responding by announcing their intent to appeal the judgment in Administrative Court.

League tables
Last updated: 2 June 2010

Group A

Group B

Group C

Group D

Group E

Group F

Group G

Group H

Second-place promotion
Along with the group winners, the top four second-place clubs in CFA 2 earn promotion to the CFA.

References

External links
 CFA 2 Official Page
 CFA 2 Statistics

Championnat National 3 seasons
5
France